An interolog is a conserved interaction between a pair of proteins which have interacting homologs in another organism. The term was introduced in a 2000 paper by Walhout et al.

Example 

Suppose that A and B are two different interacting human proteins, and A' and B' are two different interacting dog proteins.  Then the interaction between A and B is an interolog of the interaction between A' and B' if the following conditions all hold:
A is a homolog of A'. (Protein homologs have similar amino acid sequences and derive from a common ancestral sequence).
B is a homolog of B'.
A and B interact.
A' and B' interact.

Thus, interologs are homologous pairs of protein interactions across different organisms.

See also
Homology (biology)
Systems biology
Bioinformatics

References

External links
 Interactome.org: Interactome portal site.
 Interactomics.org: Interactomics portal site.
 : Cross-species interaction prediction site.

Protein complexes
Bioinformatics